Manuel Maranda (born 9 July 1997) is an Austrian professional footballer who plays as a defender for Blau-Weiß Linz. Their cousins Lukas and Philipp Malicsek are footballer.

References

External links

 
 Manuel Maranda at ÖFB

Living people
1997 births
Association football defenders
Austrian footballers
Austria youth international footballers
Austria under-21 international footballers
Austrian Football Bundesliga players
2. Liga (Austria) players
Austrian Regionalliga players
3. Liga players
FC Admira Wacker Mödling players
FC Wacker Innsbruck (2002) players
FC Carl Zeiss Jena players
SKN St. Pölten players
Austrian expatriate footballers
Expatriate footballers in Germany
Austrian expatriate sportspeople in Germany